Martin Adamský (born 13 July 1981) is a Czech professional ice hockey player. He currently plays with HC Oceláři Třinec in the Czech Extraliga.

He started with HC Oceláři Třinec during the 2010–11 season.

References

External links

1981 births
Living people
People from Studénka
Czech ice hockey forwards
HC Oceláři Třinec players
Sportspeople from the Moravian-Silesian Region
HC Plzeň players
Lubbock Cotton Kings players
Idaho Steelheads (ECHL) players
HC Havířov players
HC Kometa Brno players
Czech expatriate ice hockey players in the United States